Qadardalikoi is a fantasy miniatures wargame published by Tékumel Games in 1983.

Gameplay
Qadardalikoi involves the Armies of the Five Empires, the armies of the various nonhuman races, and describes a number of tactical and strategic maneuvers and formations. The rules are much more detailed than the two earlier Tekumel miniature rules sets: Legions of the Petal Throne and Missum!.

History
Originally published by Tékumel Games in 1983, and republished it in 1984. It was later republished by Tita's House of Games in 1998.

Reception
Frederick Paul Kiesche III reviewed Qadardalikoi in Space Gamer No. 71. Kiesche commented that "Qadardalikoi is [...] a mixed blessing to EPT RPGers.  Most of the information pertains to miniatures, and will most likely be useless.  However, there is much useful stuff for those who are willing to work a little."

See also
 Legions of the Petal Throne, a 1975 Tékumel miniatures wargame
 The Armies of Tékumel, six army supplements for Tékumel miniatures wargaming, 1978-1998
 EPT Miniatures, a 1983 set of miniatures for Tékumel wargaming

References

External links

Miniature wargames
Tékumel
Wargames introduced in the 1980s